Michael Webb Pierce (August 8, 1921 – February 24, 1991) was an American honky-tonk vocalist, songwriter and guitarist of the 1950s, one of the most popular of the genre, charting more number one hits than any other country artist during the decade.

His biggest hit was "In the Jailhouse Now", which charted for 37 weeks in 1955, 21 of them at number one. Pierce also charted number one for several weeks each with his recordings of "Slowly" (1954), "Love, Love, Love" (1955), "I Don't Care" (1955), "There Stands the Glass" (1953), "More and More" (1954), "I Ain't Never" (1959), and his first number one "Wondering", which stayed at the top spot for four of its 27 weeks' charting in 1952.

He recorded country gospel song "I Love Him Dearly" also. His iconic hit "Teenage Boogie" was covered by British band T. Rex as "I Love to Boogie" in 1974, but credited as being written by the group's lead singer Marc Bolan and not Pierce. The music of Webb was also made popular during the British rockabilly scene in the 1980s and 1990s.

For many, Pierce, with his flamboyant Nudie suits and twin silver dollar-lined convertibles, became the most recognizable face of country music of the era and its excesses. Pierce was a one-time member of the Grand Ole Opry and was posthumously inducted into the Country Music Hall of Fame. A tribute album in his honor (produced by singer-songwriter Gail Davies) was released in 2001 entitled Caught in the Webb – A Tribute To Country Legend Webb Pierce.

Biography
Born in West Monroe, Louisiana, United States, as a boy Pierce was infatuated with Gene Autry films and his mother's hillbilly records, particularly those of Jimmie Rodgers and Western swing and Cajun groups. He began to play guitar before he was a teenager and at 15 was given his own weekly 15-minute show, Songs by Webb Pierce, on KMLB-AM in Monroe.

He enlisted in the US Army Air Forces, and in 1942 he married Betty Jane Lewis. After he was discharged, the couple moved to Shreveport, Louisiana, where Pierce worked in the men's department of a Sears Roebuck store.  In 1947, the couple appeared on KTBS-AM's morning show as "Webb Pierce with Betty Jane, the Singing Sweetheart".  Pierce also performed at local engagements, developing his unique style that was once described as "a wailing whiskey-voiced tenor that rang out every drop of emotion."

Rise to fame
In 1949, California-based 4 Star Records signed the Webbs under separate contracts, with his wife signed for duets with her husband under the name Betty Jane and Her Boyfriends. However, success only came for Pierce, and in the summer of 1950, the couple divorced.

He moved to KWKH-AM and joined Louisiana Hayride during its first year, and devised a plan to achieve instant "stardom". Before the show, he bought tickets for several young girls in line and asked them to sit in the first row, and after each of his songs to scream and beg for more. It worked; their enthusiasm spread throughout the audience.

Pierce assembled and performed with a band of local Shreveport musicians, including pianist Floyd Cramer, guitarist-vocalist Faron Young, bassist Tillman Franks and vocalists Teddy and Doyle Wilburn. He also founded a record label, Pacemaker; and Ark-La-Tex Music, a publishing company, with Horace Logan, the director of the Hayride. On Pacemaker, Pierce made several records between 1950 and 1951 designed to attract radio play around Louisiana.

Shreveport to Nashville
In 1951, Pierce got out of his 4 Star contract and was quickly signed by Decca Records. His second single, "Wondering", became his breakthrough hit, climbing to No. 1 early in 1952. Pierce moved to Nashville, Tennessee where he met and married his second wife, Audrey Greisham. In June 1952, he had his second No. 1 single with "That Heart Belongs to Me".

In September 1952, the Grand Ole Opry needed to fill the vacancy left by the firing of Hank Williams, and Pierce was invited to join the cast. After Williams' death, he became the most popular singer in country music; for the next four years, every single he released hit the top ten, with ten reaching No. 1, including "There Stands the Glass" (1953), "Slowly" (1954), "More and More" (1954) (a million seller), and "In the Jailhouse Now" (1955). His singles spent 113 weeks at No. 1 during the 1950s, when he charted 48 singles. Thirty-nine reached the top ten, 26 reached the top four and 13 hit No. 1.

Other hits included "Back Street Affair", "Why Baby Why", "Oh, So Many Years", and "Finally"; the latter two being duets with Kitty Wells. His 1954 recording of "Slowly" was one of the first country songs to include a pedal steel guitar. He made regular appearances on ABC-TV's Ozark Jubilee including as a guest host once a month during 1956. In 1958, he recorded a rockabilly record, "The New Raunchy"/"I'll Get by Somehow" for Decca under the name Shady Wall.

On February 19, 1957, Pierce resigned from the Opry after he refused to pay commissions on bookings and for associated talent.

Pierce continued charting until 1982 with a total of 96 hits; and he toured extensively and appeared in the films Buffalo Gun, Music City USA, Second Fiddle to a Steel Guitar, and The Road to Nashville

Lavish lifestyle and later years
As his music faded from the spotlight, Pierce became known for his excessive lifestyle. He had North Hollywood tailor Nudie Cohen, who had made flamboyant suits for Pierce, line two convertibles with silver dollars. He built a $30,000 guitar-shaped swimming pool at his Nashville home which became a popular paid tourist attraction – nearly 3,000 people visited it each week – causing his neighbors, led by singer Ray Stevens, to file suit and prevail against Pierce to end the tours.

He remained with Decca and its successor, MCA, well into the 1970s, but by 1977 he was recording for Plantation Records. Even though he had occasional minor hits, charting in a 1982 duet with Willie Nelson, a remake of "In the Jailhouse Now", he spent his final years tending to his businesses, and his legend became clouded due to his reputation as a hard drinker. Webb and his daughter Debbie recorded the ballad "On My Way Out" as the Pierces, and she was a member of the country group Chantilly in the early 1980s.

Pierce waged a long battle with pancreatic cancer, which he lost on February 24, 1991, and was buried in the Woodlawn Memorial Park Cemetery in Nashville.

Legacy
Pierce has a star on the Hollywood Walk of Fame at 1600 Vine Street. He was inducted, posthumously, into the Country Music Hall of Fame in October 2001 and into the Louisiana Music Hall of Fame in 2008.

Caught in the Webb–a Tribute to the Legendary Webb Pierce was released on Audium Records in 2001. Produced and arranged by singer-songwriter Gail Davies, this album features Willie Nelson, Crystal Gayle, George Jones, Emmylou Harris, The Del McCoury Band, Charley Pride, Allison Moorer, Dwight Yoakam, Pam Tillis, Dale Watson, The Jordanaires, Gail Davies, and others. Gail Davies herself first charted in 1978 with "No Love Have I", a No. 26 Billboard Country hit that Pierce had recorded (and taken to No. 4) in 1959. Proceeds from this album will benefit The Minnie Pearl Cancer Foundation.

Footage of Pierce singing "There Stands the Glass" was featured in the 2005 documentary No Direction Home by Martin Scorsese about early influences on Bob Dylan. Pierce's hit single "More and More" was played in the title credits of the 2006 horror film The Hills Have Eyes.

Discography

Albums

Singles

Guest singles

References

External links

 Webb Pierce recordings at the Discography of American Historical Recordings.

1921 births
1991 deaths
American country singer-songwriters
American country guitarists
American male guitarists
Country Music Hall of Fame inductees
People from West Monroe, Louisiana
Musicians from Shreveport, Louisiana
Deaths from pancreatic cancer
Grand Ole Opry members
Four Star Records artists
Decca Records artists
Apex Records artists
20th-century American singers
20th-century American guitarists
Singer-songwriters from Louisiana
Guitarists from Louisiana
Country musicians from Louisiana
20th-century American male musicians
United States Army Air Forces personnel of World War II
American male singer-songwriters